Antonis Tritsis (1937 – 7 April 1992) was a Greek politician and urban planner, born and raised in the town of Argostoli on the island of Cefalonia.

During his youth, he was an athlete of Panathinaikos A.O. A founding member of the Panhellenic Socialist Movement (PASOK), he was elected MP in the Greek Parliament with PASOK in 1981 and 1985 and served as Minister of Urban Planning, and Minister for National Education and Religious Affairs. In 1989 he established the short-lived Greek Radical Movement, and in 1990, in a political shift, he was elected mayor of Athens with support from the New Democracy party. Assuming office, he appeared voluble as to his pet projects of bold planting of trees throughout Athens to restrain excessive construction and air pollution in the city, along with those of the unification of the archaeological sites in Athens' historical centre and the re-introduction of the tram railway. He died after a stroke in April 1992.

1937 births
1992 deaths
Greek MPs 1981–1985
Greek MPs 1985–1989
Mayors of Athens
PASOK politicians
People from Argostoli
Ministers of National Education and Religious Affairs of Greece
Environment ministers of Greece
Greek decathletes
Greek male high jumpers
Panathinaikos Athletics
Greek sportsperson-politicians
Members of the Panhellenic Liberation Movement